Botryobacter is a Gram-negative and rod-shaped bacterial genus from the family of Hymenobacteraceae with on known species (Botryobacter ruber). Botryobacter ruber has been isolated from soil from the Gurbantunggut Desert.

References

Cytophagia
Monotypic bacteria genera
Bacteria genera
Taxa described in 2019